Førde is a former municipality in the county of Sogn og Fjordane, Norway. It was located in the traditional district of Sunnfjord. The administrative center was the town of Førde which in 2016 had 10,255 inhabitants.  Other villages in Førde municipality included Bruland, Holsen, Moskog, and Haukedalen. The Øyrane area in the town of Førde was a large industrial/commercial area for the region. The European Route E39 highway passed through the municipality, and it passed by the lake Holsavatnet.
 
The airport was actually located in neighboring Gaular municipality, just south of the border. The largest hospital in Sogn og Fjordane county, Førde Central Hospital, and the regional offices of the Norwegian Broadcasting Corporation are located in the town. The International Førde Folk Music Festival is held each summer. The local newspaper is called Firda.

At the time of its dissolution in 2020, the  municipality is the 189th largest by area out of the 422 municipalities in Norway. Førde is the 93rd most populous municipality in Norway with a population of 13,092.

General information

Førde was established as a municipality on 1 January 1838 (see formannskapsdistrikt law). The original municipality was identical to the Førde parish (prestegjeld) with the sub-parishes of Førde, Holsen, and Naustdal. On 1 January 1896, the northern sub-parish of Naustdal (population: 2,543) was separated from Førde and it became a municipality of its own. This left Førde with 2,903 residents.

During the 1960s, there were many municipal mergers across Norway due to the work of the Schei Committee. On 1 January 1964, the areas of Naustdal south of the Førdefjorden (population: 265) were transferred to Førde municipality.

On 1 January 2020, the neighboring municipalities of Førde, Naustdal, Gaular, and Jølster were merged to form the new Sunnfjord Municipality.

Name
The municipality (originally the parish) is named after the Førde farm ( nominative and  dative) since the first Førde Church was built there. The name is identical with the word fjǫrðr which means fjord (referring to the fjord now called Førdefjorden).

Coat of arms
The coat of arms was granted on 27 April 1990. It shows three silver plowshares on a red background. They symbolize the three pillars of the local economy: agriculture, horticulture, and development.

Churches
The Church of Norway had two parishes within the municipality of Førde. It was part of the Sunnfjord prosti (deanery) in the Diocese of Bjørgvin.

Geography

The municipality of Førde encompasses the valleys that lead away from the inner end of the Førdefjorden. The municipality of Naustdal borders Førde to the north, the municipalities of Jølster, Sogndal, and Balestrand are to the east, Gaular municipality is to the south, and the municipality of Askvoll lies to the west. The two largest lakes are Holsavatnet and Haukedalsvatnet. The rivers Jølstra and Gaula are both partially located in Førde municipality. The Gaularfjellet mountains are located in the east and south of the municipality. The glaciers Grovabreen and Jostefonn are located in the eastern mountainous part of Førde. The westernmost edges of the Jostedalsbreen National Park are located in the Haukedalen valley in Førde.

Government

The municipal council  of Førde was made up of 27 representatives that were elected to four year terms. The party breakdown of the final municipal council was as follows:

Attractions

Waterfalls
Halbrendsfossen: located a short walk from the Førde town center. It is a very powerful waterfall in the spring.

The Salmon
It was created by Jørn Rønnau. It blends naturally in with the green surroundings on the banks of the river Jølstra, close to the Førdehuset cultural centre.

Førdehuset
Førdehuset (literal meaning: the Førde house) is a regional cultural centre, a cornerstone for cultural life in Western Norway. The centre is centrally located in the town of Førde, surrounded by a sports complex, amphitheatre, and is next door to the County Gallery. A multitude of cultural activities are gathered together under one roof - small and large attractions/events the whole year round.

National Tourist Road

Norwegian County Road 13 (Fv13) is one of 18 national tourist roads in Norway because of the nearby waterfalls. From Førde, drivers start on a sightseeing journey with cultural attractions that date from the 19th century to the present day's city environment. The districts of Holsen and Haukedalen are typical of Western Norwegian farming communities that have created a picturesque cultivated landscape.

Rørvik Mountain, the trail with the fascinating stone walls and a marvellous view over Haukedalen. Along Råheimsdalen and Eldalen to the Gaularfjellet mountains, you will see a marvellous waterfall landscape that has been landscaped with paths for visitors. From the top of Gaularfjell mountains, hairpin bends wind down to the Vetlefjorden, an arm of the Sognefjorden. The breathtaking contrasts of steep mountainsides, winding roads, and waterfalls are characteristic of Western Norway’s exceptional scenery.

Sunnfjord Museum

The Sunnfjord Museum is one of four district museums in Sogn og Fjordane County. The main courtyard of the outdoor museum is a cluster of 25 restored antiquarian buildings sited in a cultural landscape representative of the same period. These buildings provide an insight into life and lifestyles in the Sunnfjord districts around the middle of the 19th century. The land tenant's home is on its original site with the interior as it was at the end of the 19th century. In June, July and August, there are daily guided tours through the old buildings.

Notable people

Twin towns — sister cities

Førde is twinned with:
  La Crosse, Wisconsin, United States.
  Kent, Washington, United States. Each year two students ages 14–17 are exchanged between the two cities to be youth ambassadors of their country.

See also
List of former municipalities of Norway

References

External links
Municipal fact sheet from Statistics Norway 
NRK Municipality encyclopedia 
Førde Folk Music Festival  also in English, Deutsch and francais
Firda (local newspaper) 

 
Sunnfjord
Former municipalities of Norway
1838 establishments in Norway
2020 disestablishments in Norway